Praealticus multistriatus, the linedfin rockskipper , is a species of combtooth blenny found in the Pacific Ocean, around Tonga.

References

multistriatus
Taxa named by Hans Bath
Fish described in 1992